James Allen Huggins (December 21, 1909 — July 28, 1991) was a Canadian ice hockey player who played 20 games in the National Hockey League for the Montreal Maroons during the 1930–31 season. The rest of his career, which lasted from 1927 to 1942, was spent in various minor leagues. Internationally he played for the Canadian national team at the 1933 World Championships. He was born in Toronto, Ontario.

Career statistics

Regular season and playoffs

International

External links 

1909 births
1991 deaths
Canadian ice hockey left wingers
Montreal Maroons players
Ice hockey people from Toronto
Syracuse Stars (IHL) players
Windsor Bulldogs (1929–1936) players